Natasha Vita-More (born February 23, 1950) is a strategic designer, author, speaker and innovator within the scientific and technological framework of human enhancement and life extension. Her interests are located within the ethical uses of science and technology and socio-political implications of revolutionary advances impacting humanity's future.

Early life and education 
Vita-More was born in Bronxville, New York. Vita-More studied at Accademia di Belle Arti in Ravenna, Italy (1977) after graduating with a Bachelor of Fine Art (1973). Returning to the United States, she started a commercial design firm in Telluride, Colorado (1972-1980). She completed Paralegal Certification from Blackstone School of Law in 1992. She earned a Master of Science in Future Studies at the University of Houston (2006) and a Master of Philosophy from University of Plymouth, UK. Faculty of Technology, School of Computers, Communications and Electronics, School of Communications and Media Studies M.Phil., Thesis: "Life Expansion" on the science and technology of longevity. Vita-More received a Ph.D in Media Art and Design from the Planetary Collegium, University of Plymouth, United Kingdom. Her Ph.D thesis focused on human enhancement and radical life extension.

Career
Vita-More is currently Executive Director of Humanity+ Inc. From 2012 – 2014 she was a visiting Scholar, 21st Century Medicine. Since 2012, she has been an instructor at the for-profit University of Advancing Technology and a former Chair of its Graduate Program. She has contributed the Cambridge Union Immortality Debate of 2017.

Vita-More has been an advisor to the LifeBoat Foundation, and  an advisor to Alcor Life Extension Foundation. Between 1987 and 1993 she was a producer of Transcentury Update. Between 2001 and 2004, she was the president of the Extropy Institute.

Vita-More is also signed up for cryonic preservation. Moreover, Vita-More says, "Our bodies will be the next fashion statement; we will design them in all sorts of interesting combinations of texture, colors, tones, and luminosity."

Work

In 1982, Vita-More wrote the Transhumanist Manifesto, which was on board the Cassini-Huygens Saturn mission. It discussed the possibility for overcoming disease and extending lifespans and later she founded an organization Transhumanist Arts and Culture.

In 1997 she designed the first whole-body prosthetic, entitled Primo Posthuman, which depicted how a human might look in the future with technological enhancements such as color-changing skin. "Posthumans", as written by Vita-More in one of her academic papers, "will be almost entirely augmented — human minds in artificial, eternally upgradable bodies". Her art has been exhibited at the National Centre for Contemporary Arts in Russia, the Memphis Brooks Museum of Art, and the Telluride Film Festival.

She authored Create / Recreate: the 3rd Millennial Culture on the emerging cybernetic culture and the future of humanism and the arts and sciences. She is also author of Transhumanism: What is it? concerning the basic questions of the Transhumanist philosophical, ethical and cultural worldview.

She is the co-editor and contributing author of The Transhumanist Reader: Classical and Contemporary Essays on the Science, Technology, and Philosophy of the Human Future.

Her project "Primo 3M+ 2001" future physique 3D design for superlongevity in a tongue-in-cheek is based on nanotechnology and AI.

In 2014 she was the entrepreneur and scientific Lead, together with Daniel Barranco from the Department of Cryobiology of the Spanish University of Seville, for the first time, proved that the use of cryonic technologies does not destroy the long-term memory of the simplest multi-cellular organisms.

In 2019, Aging Analytics named Vita-More one of the Top-50 Women Longevity Leaders.

Personal life

Vita-More was born in Bronxville, New York. , she lives in Scottsdale, Arizona.

Her husband is philosopher and futurist Max More.

See also
 BioArt
 Ethics
 Humanity+
 Life extension
 Philosophy
 Transhumanism

References

External links
Natasha Vita-More personal website 

1950 births
Living people
Alumni of the University of Plymouth
American artists
American transhumanists
BioArtists
Extropians
Cryonicists